Reasonable doubt refers to the legal standard of proof required in most criminal cases.

Reasonable Doubt(s) may refer to:

Reasonable Doubt (album), an album by rapper Jay-Z
Reasonable Doubt (1936 film), a British comedy
Reasonable Doubt (2014 film), a crime thriller starring Samuel L. Jackson
Reasonable Doubts, a 1990s American police drama TV series
Reasonable Doubt, a true-crime television series broadcast on Investigation Discovery
 "Reasonable Doubt", an episode of season 15 of Law & Order: Special Victims Unit
 "Reasonable Doubt", an episode of season 7 of Touched by an Angel
 Reasonable Doubt, a legal drama television series streaming on Hulu

See also
Beyond a reasonable doubt (disambiguation)